Eli Sternberg (13 November 1917  – 8 October 1988) was a researcher in solid mechanics and was considered to be the "nation's leading elastician" at the time of his death. He earned his doctorate in 1945 under Michael Sadowsky at the Illinois Institute of Technology with a dissertation entitled Non-Linear Theory of Elasticity and Applications. He made contributions widely in elasticity, especially in mathematical analysis, the theory of stress concentrations, thermo-elasticity, and visco-elasticity.

He was in 1956 a Fulbright Fellow at the Delft Institute of Technology and for the academic year 1963–1964 a Guggenheim Fellow at the Keiō University in Tokyo. For the academic year 1970-1971 he was a visiting professor in Chile and in 1968 at the University of Glasgow.

Sternberg became in 1951 a full professor at the Illinois Institute of Technology, in 1957 a professor of applied mathematics at Brown University, and in 1964 a professor of mechanics at Caltech, where he retired as professor emeritus in 1988.

Honors and awards
National Academy of Engineering
National Academy of Sciences
Timoshenko Medal

Selected publications
 with M. A. Sadowsky: 
 with M. A. Sadowsky: 
 with M. A. Sadowsky: 
 with R. A. Eubanks: 
 with F. Rosenthal: 
 
 with R. A. Eubanks: 
 with R. A. Eubanks: 
 with E. L. McDowell: 
 with J. G. Chakravorty: 
 
 
 with M. E. Gurtin: 
 with Rokurō Muki:

References

External links

NC State Univ. Distinguished Engineering Alumnus Award (Eli Sternberg 1987)
National Academy of Engineering membership listing

1988 deaths
1917 births
Austrian emigrants to the United States
American materials scientists
Members of the United States National Academy of Sciences
California Institute of Technology faculty
20th-century American engineers

Brown University faculty